Albion M. Marble (1 December 1848 – 23 May 1909) was an American architect from Massachusetts.

Marble was born in 1848.  He attended the Massachusetts Institute of Technology, graduating in 1880.  He then established himself as an architect in Fall River.  During the late 1880s he left active practice, and turned up in Boston during the 1890s, where he remained until about 1904.  At that point, he moved back to Fall River.  After a brief time, he went on to Providence, Rhode Island.  After this move, his whereabouts are unknown.

He died on May 23, 1909, in Boston.  His death certificate lists his residence as Jamaica Plain.

Despite his relative obscurity, Marble designed a number of prominent buildings in southeastern Massachusetts.

Architectural works

 1896 - Eldredge Public Library, 564 Main St, Chatham, Massachusetts
 1896 - Joseph D. Warren House, 180 Medway St, Providence, Rhode Island
 1898 - Brayton Avenue School, 425 Brayton Ave, Fall River, Massachusetts
 Demolished in 2012
 1903 - Bristol County Registry of Deeds, 11 Court St, Taunton, Massachusetts
 1904 - Watson School, Eastern Ave, Fall River, Massachusetts

References

1848 births
1909 deaths
Architects from Massachusetts
Architects from Providence, Rhode Island
People from Fall River, Massachusetts
19th-century American architects
20th-century American architects
Massachusetts Institute of Technology alumni
People from Jamaica Plain